The 2016 Big Ten Conference baseball tournament was held at TD Ameritrade Park Omaha in Omaha, Nebraska, from May 25 through 29. Ohio State claimed the Big Ten Conference's automatic bid to the 2016 NCAA Division I baseball tournament.  The event aired on the Big Ten Network.

Format and seeding
The 2016 tournament will be an 8 team double-elimination tournament.  The top eight teams based on conference regular season winning percentage earn invites to the tournament.  The teams will then play a double-elimination tournament leading to a single championship game. Ties were broken, first, on the basis of head-to-head play (when the tied teams played each other) and, after that, on the basis of record against common opponents. Because Penn State, Illinois, and Iowa did not all play each other, the tie was broken first on common opponents, and, once Penn State was eliminated from the 3-way tie, on the head-to-head series between Iowa and Illinois.

Tournament

Schedule

Games 7 and 8, originally scheduled for May 26, were postponed to May 27 due to inclement weather. Games 9 and 10 were moved to later start times on May 27.
Game 10 postponed in-game on May 27 due to inclement weather, moved to May 28.

References

Tournament
Big Ten Baseball Tournament
Big Ten baseball tournament
Big Ten baseball tournament
Sports competitions in Nebraska
Baseball in Nebraska